Jas M. Morgan is an Indigenous Canadian writer, who won the Dayne Ogilvie Prize for emerging LGBTQ writers in 2019.

Morgan, of Cree, Saulteaux and Métis heritage, is a professor in the Department of English at Ryerson University. They are also a doctoral student in art history at McGill University, and Editor-at-Large on Indigenous art for Canadian Art magazine. Their first book,  Nîtisânak, was published in 2018, and was nominated for the Lambda Literary Award for Lesbian Memoir or Biography at the 31st Lambda Literary Awards, and for the Indigenous Voices Award for English-language literature. They were identified as a Canadian writer to watch by CBC Books in 2019.

They previously worked as editor for mâmawi-âcimowak, an Indigenous art journal. Their writing has also appeared in GUTS, Malahat Review, Teen Vogue, Room, and other popular publications. In 2019 they served as one of the CBC Nonfiction Prize readers. Additionally, Morgan curated the 2019 Arts and Literary Magazines Summit.

Bibliography 

 nîtisânak (memoir, 2018, published by Metonymy Press)
Critical Sass (poems, 2016, published by bawajigaywin)

Academic Publishing

 "Distorted Love:Mapplethorpe, the Neo/Classical Sculptural Black Nude, and Visual Cultures of Transatlantic Enslavement,"  Imaginations, July 2019.
"Toward a Relational Historicization of Indigenous Art," Art Journal 77 no. 4 (2019): 127–128.
Prairie Families: Cree-Métis-Saulteux Materialities as Indigenous feminist Materialist Record of Kinship-Based Selfhood" (Master of Arts Thesis, 2018).
 "I Wonder Where They Went": Post-Reality Multiplicities and Counter-Resurgent Narratives in Thirza Cuthand's Lessons in Baby Dyke Theory," Canadian Theatre Review 175 (2018): 47-51.

Awards 

 Dayne Ogilive Prize, Writers' Trust of Canada (2019)
 Finalist, Lesbian Memoir/Biography Category, Lambda Literary Award (2019)
 Finalist, Published Prose in English, Indigenous Voices Literary Award (2019)
 Nominated for nîtisânak, Concordia University First Book Prize, Quebec Writers' Federation Awards (2019)
 Nominated, Canadian Art Kinship issue edited by Nixon, Best Editorial Package, National Magazine Awards (2018).
 Best Digital Editorial Package, "Sex Ed: Beyond the Classroom" in The Walrus, Digital Publishing Awards, National Media Awards Foundation (2019).

References

Living people
Year of birth missing (living people)
21st-century Canadian non-fiction writers
21st-century First Nations writers
Canadian art critics
Canadian magazine editors
Women magazine editors
Canadian magazine writers
Canadian memoirists
Cree people
LGBT First Nations people
LGBT memoirists
Canadian LGBT poets
Saulteaux people
21st-century memoirists
21st-century Canadian LGBT people